The Turkish national badminton team represents Turkey in international badminton team competitions. It is controlled by the Turkish Badminton Federation (Turkish: Türkiye Badminton Federasyonu), the national organization for badminton in Turkey. The Turkish national team have never competed in the Thomas Cup and the Uber Cup.

Turkey have competed multiple times at the Sudirman Cup. The Turkish women's team had entered three consecutive quarterfinals at the European Women's Team Badminton Championships from 2016 to 2020.

In individual events, Turkey has won three bronze medals at the European Badminton Championships, most of them won by Neslihan Yiğit and Özge Bayrak. Neslihan and Özge also won Turkey's first badminton medal in the European Games.

Participation in BWF competitions

Sudirman Cup

Participation in European Team Badminton Championships

Men's Team

Women's Team

Mixed Team

Participation in Islamic Solidarity Games 
The Turkish badminton team participated in the 2013 Islamic Solidarity Games in Palembang, Indonesia where badminton was first introduced into the games. Türkiye were semifinalists in both men's and women's team. Neslihan Yiğit won the gold medal in women's singles.

Men's team

Women's team

As of 2013

List of medalists

Participation in European Junior Team Badminton Championships
Mixed Team

Current squad 
The following players were selected to represent Türkiye at the 2020 European Men's and Women's Team Badminton Championships.

Male players
Emre Lale
Mehmet Capar
Emre Sonmez
Serdar Koca
Serhat Salim
Murathan Eken
Haktan Doğan

Female players
Neslihan Yiğit
Aliye Demirbağ
Özge Bayrak
Büşra Ünlü
Bengisu Erçetin
Nazlıcan İnci
Zehra Erdem
İlayda Nur Özelgül

References

Badminton
National badminton teams
Badminton in Turkey